Warrior Sound is the third studio album from British drum and bass band The Qemists. It was released on March 4, 2016 through record label Amazing Record.

"No More" is the first single from the album, released in November 2013. "Run You" is the second single from the album, released on 15 January 2016.

Track listing

Track listing (Japanese Limited Edition)

References

2016 albums
The Qemists albums